Sheer Madness (and also released as Friends and Husbands) is a 1983 German arthouse drama film directed by Margarethe von Trotta. It was entered into the 33rd Berlin International Film Festival.

Cast
 Hanna Schygulla as Olga
 Angela Winkler as Ruth
 Peter Striebeck as Franz
 Christine Fersen as Erika
 Franz Buchrieser as Dieter
 Wladimir Yordanoff as Alexaj
 Agnes Fink as Ruth's mother
 Felix Moeller as Christof
 Jochen Striebeck as Bruno
 Therese Affolter as Renate
 Werner Eichhorn as Schlesinger
 Karl Striebeck as Bruno's father

References

External links

1983 films
1983 drama films
West German films
German drama films
1980s German-language films
Films directed by Margarethe von Trotta
Films produced by Margaret Ménégoz
1980s female buddy films
1980s German films